The Rock Creek Stage Station, in Routt County, Colorado near Toponas, Colorado.

It is a three-bay, two-story log building, built around 1880.  It was listed on the National Register of Historic Places in 1982.

It is at Gore Pass and has also been known as the Gore Pass Stage Station.

It is east of Toponas, Colorado off Colorado State Highway 134.

References

Stagecoach stops
Log buildings and structures
National Register of Historic Places in Routt County, Colorado
Buildings and structures completed in 1880